Alojzy Łysko (14 April 1935 – 22 March 2021) was a Polish football player and coach.

Playing career
Łysko played for Siemianowiczanka Siemianowice, Ruch Chorzów and GKS Katowice. He also capped once for Poland, on 10 May 1964 in a friendly 3–1 victory at Ireland.

Coaching career
Łysko managed  Ruch Chorzów, GKS Katowice, Zagłębie Lubin, Śląsk Wrocław, Górnik Zabrze, KS Cracovia, Rozwój Katowice.

Personal life
He died on 22 March 2021 at the age of 85, in Siemianowice Śląskie.

Honours

Player
Ruch Chorzów:
I liga: 1960

Manager
GKS Katowice:
Polish Cup: 1985–86, 1990–91
Polish SuperCup: 1991

References

1935 births
2021 deaths
Sportspeople from Katowice
Polish footballers
Association football forwards
Poland international footballers
Ruch Chorzów players
GKS Katowice players
Polish football managers
Ruch Chorzów managers
GKS Katowice managers
Śląsk Wrocław managers
Górnik Zabrze managers
Zagłębie Lubin managers
MKS Cracovia managers